Javorice may refer to:
 Javorice, a name common among African Americans
 Javořice (meaning 'Maple hill'), a mountain in the Czech Republic